Martin Scott is an American businessman, educator, politician, and pastor from Georgia. Scott is a former Republican member of the Georgia House of Representatives from District 2.

Early life 
Scott was born in Chattanooga, Tennessee.

Education 
Scott earned a degree from Shorter College and Chattanooga State. Scott earned an MBA from Kennesaw State University.

Career 
Scott is a businessman, former teacher and realtor.

On November 2, 2004, Scott won the election and became a Republican member of Georgia House of Representatives for District 2. Scott defeated Sadie Morgan with 69.16% of the votes. On November 7, 2006, as an incumbent, Scott won the election and continued serving District 2. Scott defeated Sadie Morgan with 67.10% of the votes. On November 4, 2008, 
as an incumbent, Scott won the election and continued serving District 2. Scott defeated Sadie Morgan with 70.94% of the votes. On November 2, 2010, as an incumbent, Scott won the election unopposed and continued serving District 2.

In 2012, Scott founded River City Church in Rossville, Georgia. Scott is the lead pastor.

Personal life 
Scott's wife is Jane Scott. They have four children. Scott and his family live in Rossville, Georgia.

References

External links
Georgia House of Representatives bio
 Martin Scott at ballotpedia.org
 Q&A with Rep. Martin Scott at northwestgeorgianews.com (January 2, 2007) (archive)

21st-century American politicians
Kennesaw State University alumni
Living people
Republican Party members of the Georgia House of Representatives
People from Rossville, Georgia
Shorter University alumni
Year of birth missing (living people)